The Stratford Nationals were a semi-professional baseball team based in Stratford, Ontario, that competed in the Intercounty Baseball League, an independent baseball league.

Early history
For many years, Stratford was a premier franchise in the Intercounty Baseball League and one of the league's founding members in 1919 (along with Galt, Guelph, and Kitchener). The team operated at various times as the Stratford Nationals, the Stratford Kraven Knits, and Stratford Hillers.

Late history
The team was moved from St. Thomas, Ontario, to Stratford in 2004 after several years of dwindling fan support in St. Thomas. They played their home games at National Stadium.

Prior to its re-location, the team changed its name from the Storm to the Nationals for the 2006 season, in view of the Canadian National Railway's historical importance to Stratford. The Nationals struggled in their final seasons, missing the playoffs regularly.

On November 25, 2008, the team announced that the league had approved the sale of the Stratford Nationals to Elliott Kerr, president of the Landmark Sports Group, and the transfer of the franchise to the City of Mississauga, where it became the Mississauga Twins.

Championships

Intercounty League

 1934 (as the Nationals)
 1938 (as the Nationals)
 1939 (as the Nationals)
 1940 (as the Nationals)
 1946 (as the Nationals)
 1974 (as the Kraven Knits)
 1976 (as the Hillers)
 1977 (as the Hillers)
 1980 (as the Hillers)
 1986 (as the Hillers)
 1987 (as the Hillers)
 1989 (as the Hillers)
 1991 (as the Hillers)
 1992 (as the Hillers)

The Stratford Nationals also won the Ontario Baseball Association title in 1930, 1931, 1932, 1933 and 1934.

External links

References
 Intercounty Baseball League's 1998 Record Book by Editor Herb Morell and Dominico Promotions Inc.

Intercounty Baseball League
Baseball teams established in 1919
Sport in Stratford, Ontario
Baseball teams in Ontario